Capsorubin is a natural red dye of the xanthophyll class. As a food coloring, it has the E number E160c(ii).  Capsorubin is a carotenoid found in red bell pepper (Capsicum annuum) and a component of paprika oleoresin. Capsorubin is also found in some species of lily.

References

Carotenoids